Fourth Street Live! is a  entertainment and retail complex located on 4th Street, between Liberty and Muhammad Ali Boulevard, in Downtown Louisville, Kentucky. It is owned and was developed by the Cordish Company; it was designed by Louisville architects, Bravura Corporation. Fourth Street Live! first opened to the public on June 1, 2004, and all stores were completed for the grand opening on October 30, 2004. City planners hoped that the district would attract further commercial business development while providing an attractive entertainment venue for the city's hotel and tourist business as well as the local population.

Restaurants and entertainment venues in the complex include Gordon Biersch Brewing Company, T.G.I. Friday's, Birracibo, The Sports & Social Club (bowling alley and restaurant), Tavern on 4th street, The Fudgery and the new bourbon raw bar.

Fourth Street Live! also has a variety of bars and nightclubs including Tavern on Fourth, The Sports & Social Club, Howl at the Moon, and PBR Louisville.

A mall-style food court is also located in the complex with restaurants like Subway, 

Traffic on 4th Street through the complex is usually closed for large public gatherings such as music concerts and other events.

History

Background

Fourth Street Live! began as a downtown revitalization project to redesign and modernize the former Louisville Galleria, a similar but unsuccessful project opened in the early 1980s with the same goals of revitalizing downtown. The Galleria, in turn, had been built on the site of the River City Mall, which opened in 1973, also with similar goals of revitalizing downtown. Fourth Street itself had long been the main shopping and entertainment destination in Downtown Louisville.

The idea of turning Fourth Street into a pedestrian mall actually dates back to 1943, when mayor Wilson W. Wyatt suggested the idea. Proposals were drafted over the years but funding for the $1.5 million River City Mall project was not secured until 1971. The Mall originally stretched all the way from Liberty to Broadway, and was initially successful, but over the years vehicular traffic was slowly reintroduced and the mall scaled back.

Tenant changes

On February 16, 2007, the Louisville Convention & Visitors Bureau opened its new Visitor Information Center at the North entrance to Fourth Street Live. The center will also supply information to outside passersby via a high-tech video wall that will run video on different cultural events and attractions.

Expansion

On May 8, 2017, the Cordish Company announced that it will expand the district with the addition of Spark Louisville, a new collaborative workspace coming in 2018.

Events

Some events held at Fourth Street Live! in the past have included national acts in concert, such as Kid Rock, 3 Doors Down, O.A.R., Sister Hazel, VHS or Beta, Goo Goo Dolls, Tracy Lawrence, Jason Michael Carroll, Jake Owen, Jason Aldean, Eric Church, Clay Walker, Three Dog Night, !Smack Talk!, Phil Vassar, Buddy Jewell, Emerson Drive, Finger Eleven, The Marshall Tucker Band, Little Texas, Blue October, Shiny Toy Guns, Gavin Degraw, Violent Femmes, Gretchen Wilson, Justin Bieber The Big Band Theory-USA and many others.

The University of Louisville's annual "Run for the L of It" 5K begins and ends at Fourth Street Live.  Also, the finish line of the Louisville Ironman Triathlon, which debuted in 2007, is located at Fourth Street Live.  The Venue also holds annual events celebrating the Kentucky Derby and was the "Cup Village" when Louisville hosted the 2008 Ryder Cup and often holds pep rallies and celebrations for the University of Louisville's athletic teams including for the teams that made the 2005 Final Four, 2007 Orange Bowl, and the 2007 College World Series.  During the Summer, Fourth Street Live hosts Summer Concert Series, which is a series of concerts featuring top national acts.  A Mardi Gras parade, Halloween trick-or-treating, and a New Year's Eve celebration are other annual events which are popular at the venue.

The venue will also be part of the city's annual Holiday extravaganza, Holiday in the City.

See also
 Louisville Clock, formerly at Theatre Square  (dismantled in 2015)
 List of attractions and events in the Louisville metropolitan area

References

External links
 Fourth Street Live! official website
 The Cordish Company — Company that developed and operates Fourth Street Live!

Shopping malls in Kentucky
Shopping malls established in 2004
Tourist attractions in Louisville, Kentucky
Buildings and structures in Louisville, Kentucky
The Cordish Companies